The bras des Canots is a tributary of the Valin River, flowing in the unorganized territory of Mont-Valin, in the Le Fjord-du-Saguenay Regional County Municipality, in the administrative region of Saguenay-Lac-Saint-Jean, in Quebec, in Canada. The course of the Bras des Canots flows mainly in the Monts-Valin National Park.

A secondary forest road serves the southwest bank of the Bras des Canots valley and the lakes upstream; other secondary forest roads have been developed in the sector for the needs of forestry and recreational tourism activities.

The surface of the Canoe's arm is usually frozen from the end of November to the beginning of April, however the safe circulation on the ice is generally done from mid-December to the end of March.

Geography 
The main neighboring watersheds of Bras des Canots are:
 North side: Moncouche Lake, Doumic lake, Nisipi River, Sainte-Marguerite River, bras de l'Enfer (rivière à Mars);
 East side: Martin-Valin Lake, Gauthier brook, Sainte-Marguerite River, Boivin River (bras des Murailles), Bras de l'Enfer, Fournier arm;
 South side: Valin River, Saguenay River, Le Petit Bras (Valin river);
 West side: Saint-Louis River, Hector stream, Valin River, Bras de l'Enfer, Bras du Nord, Shipshaw River.

The Bras des Canots rises at the mouth of Duck Lake.

From its source, the course of the Bras des Canots descends on  according to the following segments:

Upper course of Bras des Canots

  south-west, to the east shore of Buttercup Lake;
  south-west, until crossing an unidentified lake over its full length to its mouth;
  south-east, for the east, to the bottom of a narrow bay on the north-west shore of lac Martin-Valin;
  towards the South-East, then towards the West by crossing lac Martin-Valin, in particular by bypassing a peninsula attached to the West bank, stretching over  eastwards, to its mouth;

Lower reaches of Bras des Canots

  to the Southwest, in a large inverted Z, to the bottom of a bay on the north shore of Lac aux Canots;
  towards the Southwest, crossing Lac aux Canots;
  south-west, in a deep valley, up to a bend in the river;
  to the south in a deep valley with a drop of  up to the mouth of the river.

The mouth of the Bras des Canots flows onto the north bank of the Valin River, bypassing an island which blocks the mouth. This confluence is located at:
  North of the mouth of the Valin river;
  north-east of downtown Saguenay (city);
  North-west of the mouth of the Saguenay river.

From the mouth of the Bras des Canots, the current follows the course of the Valin river, then the course of the Saguenay river to the height of Tadoussac where it merges with the Saint Lawrence river.

Toponymy 
The toponym "Bras des Canots" was formalized on December 2, 1970, at the Place Names Bank of the Commission de toponymie du Québec.

See also 

 Le Fjord-du-Saguenay Regional County Municipality
 Mont-Valin, a TNO
 Valin River, a watercourse
 Saguenay River
 Martin-Valin Lake
 St. Lawrence River
 List of rivers of Quebec

Notes and references 

Rivers of Saguenay–Lac-Saint-Jean
Le Fjord-du-Saguenay Regional County Municipality